The 2014 Greek Cup Final was the 70th final of the Greek Football Cup. It took place on 26 April 2014 at Olympic Stadium, between Panathinaikos and PAOK. It was Panathinaikos' twenty eighth Greek Cup Final in their 106 years of existence and PAOK's seventeenth Greek Cup Final of their 88-year history.

Venue

This was the twenty first Greek Cup Final held at the Athens Olympic Stadium, after the 1983, 1984, 1985, 1986, 1987, 1988, 1989, 1990, 1993, 1994, 1995, 1996, 1999, 2000, 2002, 2009, 2010, 2011, 2012 and 2013 finals.

The Athens Olympic Stadium was built in 1982 and renovated once in 2004. The stadium is used as a venue for AEK Athens and was used for Olympiacos, Panathinaikos and Greece in various occasions. Its current capacity is 69,618 and hosted 3 UEFA European Cup/Champions League Finals in 1983, 1994 and 2007, a UEFA Cup Winners' Cup Final in 1987, the 1991 Mediterranean Games and the 2004 Summer Olympics.

Background
Panathinaikos qualified for the Greek Cup Final twenty seven times, winning seventeen of them. They last played in a Final in 2010, when they won Aris, 1–0.

PAOK qualified for the Greek Cup Final sixteen times, winning four of them. They last played in a Final was in 2003, where they had won Aris by 1–0.

Route to the final

Match

Details

References

2014
Cup Final
Greek Cup Final 2013
Greek Cup Final 2013
Sports competitions in Athens
April 2014 sports events in Europe